Luther Johnson may refer to:
Luther Alexander Johnson (1875–1965), American politician
Luther Johnson (racing driver) (1903–1978), American racecar driver
Luther Johnson (Guitar Junior) (1939–2022), American Chicago blues singer and guitarist
Luther "Georgia Boy" Johnson (1934–1976), American Chicago blues guitarist and singer
Luther "Houserocker" Johnson (1939–2019), American electric blues singer, guitarist, and songwriter